Emanuele Filiberto Umberto Reza Ciro René Maria di Savoia (born 22 June 1972) is a member of the House of Savoy. He is the son and heir of Vittorio Emanuele of Savoy and only male-line grandson of Umberto II, the last King of Italy. As heir-apparent to the disputed headship of the House of Savoy, Emanuele Filiberto styles himself as "Prince of Venice" and "Prince of Piedmont".

Emanuele Filiberto grew up as an exile from Italy, because until November 2002 the Italian constitution prohibited the male issue of the Savoy kings of Italy from entering or staying on Italian territory. Since returning to Italy, he has made many appearances on national television, including his participation as a contestant in Ballando con le stelle (the Italian version of Dancing with the Stars), and the Sanremo Music Festival.

He is married to French actress Clotilde Courau.

Early life and family
Emanuele Filiberto was born in Geneva, Switzerland, the only child of Vittorio Emanuele, Prince of Naples, a disputed head of the House of Savoy, and his wife, Marina Doria, a Swiss former water ski champion.

On 10 November 2002, he accompanied his father and mother to Italy, following revocation of the provision in the Italian constitution that forbade the male Savoy descendants of kings of Italy from setting foot in the country. On the three-day trip, he accompanied his parents on a visit to the Vatican for a 20-minute audience with Pope John Paul II. He also appeared in a TV commercial for a brand of olives, in which he said they made you "feel like a king".

On 25 September 2003 he married Clotilde Courau, a French actress, at the Basilica of Santa Maria degli Angeli e dei Martiri in Rome. The best man was Prince Albert of Monaco; among the 1200 guests were Valentino Garavani – who had designed the wedding dress – and Pierre Cardin.

As of 2022, Emanuele Filberto has been leading an effort to reclaim the family jewels belonging to the House of Savoy. The jewels are estimated to be worth $335 million and have been held by the Italian government since the abolition of the monarchy in 1946.

Controversies
In 2015 Emanuele Filiberto engaged in a public spat on Twitter with aristocratic journalist Beatrice Borromeo who broke the story of his father's confession on video regarding the death of Dirk Hamer. Vittorio Emanuele had sued the newspaper for defamation, but in 2015 after it won the case, Borromeo tweeted ''Vincere una causa è sempre piacevole, ma contro Vittorio Emanuele di Savoia la goduria è doppia! ("Winning a case is always nice, but against Victor Emmanuel of Savoy there is double the pleasure"), and "caro @efsavoia goditi questa sentenza" ("dear @efsavoia enjoy this judgement") which provoked Emanuele Filiberto to defend his father. She had earlier confronted him on camera with a copy of a book on the murder by Hamer's sister, whose preface she had written.

In 2018, following the release of polling data by the Istituto Piepoli that showed 15 percent of Italians favoured the formation of a royalist party and eight percent supported him as future king, Emanuele Filiberto said he was contemplating the launch of a political party to advocate for the restoration of the monarchy in Italy.

Titles, styles and honours

Emanuele Filiberto is, by strict primogeniture in the male-line, the heir apparent of the House of Savoy, Italy's former ruling dynasty. In June 2006 his distant cousin Amedeo, 5th Duke of Aosta, declared himself to be head of the house and rightful Duke of Savoy, maintaining that Vittorio Emanuele had forfeited his dynastic rights when he married Emanuele Filiberto's mother, Marina Ricolfi Doria, in 1971 without the legally required permission of his father and sovereign-in-exile, Umberto II. Emanuele Filiberto and his father applied for judicial intervention to forbid Amedeo from using the title Duke of Savoy. In February 2010, the court of Arezzo ruled that the Duke of Aosta and his son must pay damages totalling 50,000 euros to their cousins and cease using the surname Savoy instead of Savoy-Aosta. The Duke of Aosta appealed the ruling and the dynastic dispute is still unresolved.

Ancestry

Honours

Dynastic honours
 House of Savoy: Knight of the Supreme Order of the Most Holy Annunciation
 House of Savoy: Knight Grand Cordon of the Order of Saints Maurice and Lazarus
 House of Savoy: Knight Grand Cross of the Civil Order of Savoy
 House of Bourbon-Two Sicilies (Franco-Neapolitan branch): Bailiff Knight Grand Cross of Justice of the Sacred Military Constantinian Order of Saint George
 Montenegrin Royal Family: Knight of the Order of Petrovic Njegos
 Montenegrin Royal Family: Knight Grand Cross of the Order of Prince Danilo I
 Montenegrin Royal Family: Knight of the Order of Saint Peter of Cetinje
 Russian Imperial Family: Knight Grand Cordon of the Order of St. Alexander Nevsky
 Abanyiginya Dynasty: Knight Grand Collar of the Royal Order of the Drum (Rwanda)

National and foreign honours
  Sovereign Military Order of Malta: Bailiff Grand Cross of Honor and Devotion of the Sovereign Military Order of Malta
 : Knight Grand Officer of the Order of Saint-Charles
 : Kentucky colonel

References

External links
Official website of Emanuele Filiberto of Savoy

20th-century Roman Catholics
21st-century Roman Catholics
Grand Officers of the Order of Saint-Charles
Dancing with the Stars winners
1972 births
Living people
People from Geneva
Princes of Piedmont
Princes of Venice
Alumni of Institut Le Rosey
Princes of Savoy
Italian Roman Catholics
Italian exiles